Davis is an unincorporated area and census-designated place (CDP) in Carteret County, North Carolina, United States. As of the 2010 census it had a population of 422.

Geography
Davis is located east of the center of Carteret County, on the northwest shore of Core Sound, between Jarrett Bay to the west and Oyster Creek to the northeast. To the southeast, across Core Sound, is Core Banks, a barrier island that is part of Cape Lookout National Seashore, with access by ferry from Davis. U.S. Route 70 passes through the town, leading southwest  to Beaufort and northeast  to its eastern terminus at Atlantic.

Demographics

References

Census-designated places in Carteret County, North Carolina
Census-designated places in North Carolina
Populated coastal places in North Carolina